The 2016 Johan Cruyff Shield was the 21st edition of the Johan Cruyff Shield, an annual Dutch football match played between the winners of the previous season's Eredivisie and KNVB Cup. The match was contested by Feyenoord, the 2015–16 KNVB Cup winners, and PSV Eindhoven, champions of the 2015–16 Eredivisie. It was held at the Amsterdam Arena on 31 July 2016. Watched by a crowd of 30,000 and a television audience of 1.7 million, PSV won the match 1–0.

This was the first Johan Cruyff Shield to be played after the death of its eponym Johan Cruyff. The trophy was awarded by Susila Cruyff, his daughter.

Match

References

 

2016
2016–17 in Dutch football
J
J
Johan Cruyff Shield, 2016
July 2016 sports events in Europe